Tomhicken (also Tomhickon) is an unincorporated community in Sugarloaf Township, Luzerne County, Pennsylvania, United States. Tomhicken is notable for being a junction point between the Lehigh Valley Railroad's Tomhicken Branch and the Pennsylvania Railroad's Catawissa Branch. Tomhicken is part of the Greater Hazleton region.

References

Unincorporated communities in Luzerne County, Pennsylvania
Unincorporated communities in Pennsylvania